Return to Paradise (French: Retour au paradis) is a 1935 French film directed by Serge de Poligny and starring Claude Dauphin, Mary Morgan and Marcel André. The film's sets were designed by Pierre Schild.

Cast
 Claude Dauphin as Robert Ginet 
 Mary Morgan as Line Sazarin  
 Marcel André as Le docteur Bouvard  
 Jeanne Fusier-Gir as La baronne de Pindêche  
 Viviane Romance as Suzanne  
 Marcel Dalio as Le notaire  
 Jean Tissier as Le poète  
 Ginette Darcy as Simone  
 Andrews Engelmann as Mareuil  
 Simone Dehelly 
 Raymond Cordy 
 André Fouché 
 J.C. Christian 
 André Numès Fils 
 Albert Malbert
 André Siméon 
 Andrée Lorraine 
 Rose Amy 
 Michèle Michel 
 Annie Carriel 
 Valentine Camax

References

Bibliography 
 Philippe Rège. Encyclopedia of French Film Directors, Volume 1. Scarecrow Press, 2009.

External links 
 

1935 films
1930s French-language films
Films directed by Serge de Poligny
French black-and-white films
1930s French films